Central Maine Airport of Norridgewock  is a public use airport in Somerset County, Maine, United States. It is owned by the Town of Norridgewock and is located four nautical miles (7.4 km) west of the central business district.

Facilities and aircraft 
It has two asphalt runways designated 03/21 and 15/33, both with surfaces measuring 3,999 by 90 feet (1,219 x 27 m).

For the 12-month period ending July 31, 2006, the airport had 9,824 aircraft operations, an average of 27 per day: 100% general aviation with a few military and ultralights. At that time there were 53 aircraft based at this airport: 84% single-engine, 8% multi-engine and 8% ultralights.

References

External links 
 Aerial photo as of 7 May 1996 from USGS The National Map
 
 

Airports in Somerset County, Maine
Norridgewock, Maine